Gwadar protest is a current ongoing protest from 15 November 2021 on Gwadar's Port Road led by Maulana Hidayat ur Rehman Baloch and other leaders. Thousands of women along with their infants and children are protesting and want free access to the sea for fishermen, an end to harassment by the Coast Guard, seizure of vehicles and closure of trades at the border.

References

2021 in Pakistan
Gwadar District
2021 protests
Protests in Pakistan